Banna is a town in the Barisal Division of Bangladesh. It is located at 22°48'0N 90°13'0E and has an altitude of 1 metres (6 feet).

References

Populated places in Barisal Division